The Roman Catholic Diocese of Limoges (Latin: Dioecesis Lemovicensis; French: Diocèse de Limoges) is a diocese of the Latin Church of the Roman Catholic Church in France. The diocese comprises the départments of Haute-Vienne and Creuse. After the Concordat of 1801, the See of Limoges lost twenty-four parishes from the district of Nontron which were annexed to the Diocese of Périgueux, and forty-four from the district of Confolens, transferred to the Diocese of Angoulême; but until 1822 it included the entire ancient Diocese of Tulle, when the latter was reorganized.

Since 2002, the diocese has been suffragan to the Archdiocese of Poitiers, after transferral from the Archdiocese of Bourges. Until 20 September 2016 the see was held by François Michel Pierre Kalist, who was appointed on 25 Mar 2009.  He was promoted to the See of Clermont. Since May 2017, the bishop of Limoges is Pierre-Antoine Bozo.

Early history

Early Mythology
Saint Gregory of Tours names St. Martial, who founded the Church of Limoges, as one of the seven bishops sent from Rome to Gaul in the middle of the 3rd century. An anonymous life of St. Martial (Vita primitiva), discovered and published by Abbé Arbellot, represents him as sent to Gaul by St. Peter. Controversy has arisen over the date of this biography. The discovery in the library at Karlsruhe of a manuscript copy written at Reichenau by Regimbertus, a monk who died in 846, places the original before that date. The biography is written in rhythmical prose; Charles-Félix Bellet thinks it belongs to the 7th century, while Charles De Smedt and Louis Duchesne maintain that the "Vita primitiva" is much later than Gregory of Tours (died 590). Charles Ferdinand de Lasteyrie du Saillant  gives 800 as the date of its origin.

In addition to the manuscript already cited, the Abbey of St. Martial at the beginning of the 11th century possessed a circumstantial life of its patron saint, according to which, and to the cycle of later legends derived from it, St. Martial was one of the seventy-two disciples who witnessed the Passion and Ascension of Christ, was present on the first Pentecost and at the martyrdom of St. Stephen. followed St. Peter to Antioch and to Rome, and was sent to Gaul by the Prince of the Apostles, who assigned Austriclinium and Alpinian to accompany him. The three were welcomed at Tulle and turned away from Ahun. They set out towards Limoges, where St. Martial erected on the site of the present cathedral a shrine in honour of St. Stephen. A pagan priest, Aurelian, wished to throw St. Martial into prison, but was struck dead, then brought to life, baptized, ordained and later consecrated bishop by the saint. Aurelian is the patron of the guild of butchers in Limoges. Forty years after the Ascension, Christ appeared to Martial, and announced to him the approach of death. The churches of Limoges celebrate this event on 16 June. After labouring for twenty-eight years as a missionary in Gaul, the saint died at the age of fifty-nine, surrounded by his converts of Poitou, Berry, Auvergne and Aquitaine.

The writer of this "Life" pretends to be Aurelian, St. Martial's disciple and successor in the See of Limoges. Louis Duchesne thinks it not unlikely that the real authorship of this "apocryphal and lying" work should be attributed to the chronicler Adhémar de Chabannes, noted for his fabrications. M. de Lasteyrie however is of the opinion that the Life was written about 955, before the birth of Adhémar. Be that as it may, this "Vita Aureliana" played an important part at the beginning of the 11th century, when the Abbot Hugh (1019–1025) brought before several councils the question of the Apostolic date of St. Martial's mission. Before the Carolingian period there is no trace of the story that St. Martial was sent to Gaul by St. Peter. It did not spread until the 11th century and was revived in the seventeenth by the Carmelite Bonaventure de Saint-Amable, in his voluminous "Histoire de St. Martial". Duchesne and M. de Lasteyrie assert that it cannot be maintained against the direct testimony of St. Gregory of Tours, who places the origin of the Church of Limoges about the year 250.

Saintly patrons
The diocese specially honours the following: St. Sylvanus (Silvain), a native of Ahun, martyr; St. Adorator disciple of St. Ambrose, suffered martyrdom at Lubersac; St. Victorianus, an Irish hermit; St. Vaast, a native of the diocese who became Bishop of Arras and baptized king Clovis (5th–6th century); St. Psalmodius, a native of Britain, died a hermit at Eymoutiers; St. Yrieix, d. in 591, chancellor to Theudebert II King of Austrasia and founder of the monastery of Attanum (the towns of Saint-Yrieix are named after him); St. Etienne de Muret (1046–1126), who founded the famous Benedictine abbey of Grandmont.

Councils of Limoges
The Council of Limoges, held in 1031, is noted not only for its decision with regard to St. Martial's mission, but because, at the instigation of Abbot Odolric, it proclaimed the "Truce of God" and threatened with general excommunication those feudal lords who would not swear to maintain it.  Another council was held at Limoges by Pope Urban II in December 1095, at which Bishop Humbauld was deposed.

Middle Ages
The Cathedral of St-Étienne was served by a Chapter, composed of three dignities (The Dean, The Precentor, and the Archdeacon), and twenty-nine canons.  The Dean held a prebend, as did the Precentor. There was only one Archdeacon in the diocese, the Archdeacon of Limoges (sometimes called the Archdeacon of Malemort).  The prebends were assigned by the Chapter, except those which belonged ex officio to the Bishop, the Dean, the Precentor, the Abbot of Benevent and the Prior of Aureil. By the seventeenth century the city of Limoges had a population of around 4,000, divided into two parishes; there was one collège (high school).  By 1730 the population had risen to 30,000, and there were twelve urban parishes, but still only one college. In the city there were ten religious houses of men and eight monasteries of monks. The entire diocese was divided up into approximately 1,000 parishes, supervised by seventeen Archpriests.

The ecclesiastics who served the crypt of St. Martial organized themselves into a monastery in 848, and built a church beside that of St.-Pierre-du-Sépulchre which overhung the crypt. This new church, which they called St-Sauveur, was demolished in 1021 and replaced in 1028 by a larger edifice in Auvergnat style. Urban II came in person to reconsecrate it in 1095. In the 13th century the chapel of St. Benedict arose beside the old church of St-Pierre-du-Sépulchre. It was also called the church of the Grand Confraternity of St. Martial. The different organizations which were grouped around it, anticipated and solved many important sociological questions.

In the Middle Ages, Limoges comprised two towns: one called the "City", the other the "Chateau" or "Castle". The government of the "Castle" belonged at first to the Abbots of St. Martial who claimed to have received it from king Louis the Pious. Later, the viscounts of Limoges claimed this authority, and constant friction existed until the beginning of the 13th century, when owing to the new communal activity, consuls were appointed, to whose authority the abbots were forced to submit in 1212. After two intervals during which the English kings imposed their rule, king Charles V of France in 1371 united the "Castle" with the royal demesne, and thus ended the political rule of the Abbey of St. Martial. Until the end of the old regime, however, the abbots of St. Martial exercised direct jurisdiction over the Combes quarter of the city.

In 1370 the city was completely sacked by Prince Edward, the Black Prince, causing a diminution in the size of the population of more than 3,000 persons.  The city had been handed over to the French in an act of treachery by the Bishop, Jean de Cros, who had been a personal friend and Councillor of the Black Prince, and when the city was taken, the English revenge was all the more vigorous.  Bishop de Cros was captured by the English, and the Prince threatened to have the bishop's head cut off. Only the intervention of the Duke of Lancaster saved Bishop le Cros.

Early modern period
It was at the priory of Bourganeuf in this diocese that Pierre d'Aubusson received the Ottoman prince Zizim, son of Sultan Mehmed II, after he had been defeated in 1483 by his brother, Bayezid II.

In 1534, Abbot Matthieu Jouviond, finding that the monastic spirit had almost totally died out in the abbey of St. Martial, thought best to change it into a collegiate church, and in 1535 King Francis I and Pope Paul III gave their consent. The Collegiate Church was suppressed in 1791, and early in the 19th century even the buildings had disappeared. In the 13th century, the Abbey of St. Martial possessed the finest library (450 volumes) in France after that of Cluny Abbey (570 volumes). Some have been lost, but 200 of them were bought by Louis XV in 1730, and to-day are part of the collections in the Bibliothèque Nationale at Paris. Most manuscripts, ornamented with beautiful miniatures, were written in the abbey itself. M. Émile Molinier and M. Rupin admit a relation between these miniatures of St. Martial and the earliest Limoges enamels, but M. de Lasteyrie disputes this theory. The Franciscans settled at Limoges in 1223. According to the chronicle of Pierre Coral, rector of St. Martin of Limoges, St. Anthony of Padua established a convent there in 1226 and departed in the first months of 1227. On the night of Holy Thursday, it is said, he was preaching in the church of St. Pierre du Queyroix, when he stopped for a moment and remained silent. At the same instant he appeared in the choir of the Franciscan monastery and read a lesson. It was doubtlessly at Châteauneuf in the territory of Limoges that took place the celebrated apparition of the Infant Jesus to St. Anthony.

Mention must also be made of the following natives of Limoges: Bernard Guidonis (1261–1313), born at La Roche d'Abeille, Bishop of Lodève and a celebrated canonist; the Aubusson family, one of whom, Pierre d'Aubusson (1483–1503), was Grand Master of the Order of Jerusalem and one of the defenders of Rhodes against the Ottomans; Marc Antoine Muret, called the "Orator of the Popes" (1526–1596). Three popes came from the Diocese of Limoges: Pierre Roger, born at Maumont (today part of the commune of Rosiers-d'Égletons), elected pope in 1342 as Clement VI, died in 1352; Etienne Albert, or Étienne d'Albret, born at Monts, elevated to the papacy in 1352 as Innocent VI, died in 1362. Pierre Roger de Beaufort, nephew of Clement VI, also born at Maumont, reigned as Gregory XI from 1371 till 1378. Maurice Bourdin, Archbishop of Braga (Portugal), antipope for a brief space in 1118, under the name of Gregory VIII, also belonged to this diocese. St. Peter Damian came to Limoges in 1062 as papal legate, to compel the monks to accept the supremacy of the Order of Cluny.

A benefit to Limoges before the Revolution was the appointment of Anne Robert Jacques Turgot as Intendant of the genéralité of Limoges (1761–1774). He managed to get a major reduction in the tax burden of the province, had a new survey completed which made possible a more just imposition of taxes, and replaced the corvée (compulsory labor) with a tax which was used to hire professional road builders, thereby greatly improving communications in the area.  In the famine of 1770–1771, he required land owners to relieve the want of the poor. On 10 February 1770, he issued the "Lettre-circulaire aux curés", in which he advised the clergy on the steps which had to be taken to form local charity bureaus. He placed the Bishop of Limoges, Louis-Charles du Plessis d'Argentré, at the head of the bureau of charity in his episcopal city. The bishop and Turgot had been fellow students at the Sorbonne and were friends. Turgot also promoted the growing of the potato, the use of the spinning wheel, and the manufacture of porcelain.

Since the separation of churches and state in 1905

Before the 1905 French law on the Separation of the Churches and the State, there were in the diocese of Limoges Jesuits, Franciscans, Marists, Oblates of Mary Immaculate and Sulpicians. The principal congregations of women which originated here are the Sisters of the Incarnation founded in 1639, contemplatives and teachers, who were restored in 1807 at Azerables, and have houses in Texas and Mexico. The Sisters of St. Alexis, nursing sisters, founded at Limoges in 1659. The Sisters of St. Joseph, founded at Dorat in February, 1841, by Elizabeth Dupleix, who had visited the prisons at Lyons with other pious women since 1805. The Congregation of Our Saviour and the Congregation of the Blessed Virgin, a nursing and teaching congregation founded at la Souterraine, in 1835, by Joséphine du Bourg.

The Sisters of the Good Shepherd (also called 'Marie Thérèse nuns'), nursing sisters and teachers, had their mother-house at Limoges.

In 2016 there were 97 female religious and 10 male religious serving in the Diocese of Limoges, a decline of 47 since 2013.

Bishops

To 1000

Saint Martial, 3rd century
Saint Aurelian, 3rd century
Ebulus
?
Alticus
?
Emerinus
?
Hermogenian
?
Adelfius I
?
Dativus 4th century
Adelfius II 4th century
Exuperius 4th century
Astidius 4th century
Peter du Palais 506
Ruricius 507
Ruricius II 535–553
Exochius 6th century
Ferreolus 575–597
Asclepius 613
Saint Loup 614–631
Simplicius 7th century
Felix ca. 650. 
Adelfius III
Rusticus 669
Autsindus 683
Hergenobert 7th century
Ermenon 8th century
Salutaris 8th century
Saint Sacerdos 720
Ausuindus 8th century
Agericus
Saint Cessadre 732]].
Rorice III. 8th century
Ebulus I. 752–768
Asclepius ca. 793
Reginbert 794-817. 
Odoacre 821–843
Stodilus 850–861
Aldo 866
Geilo 869
Anselm 869–896
Turpin D'Aubusson 905–944
Ebalus II 958–963
Hildegaire 977–990
Alduin 990–1012

1000 to 1300

Géraud I 1012–1020
Jourdain de Laront 1029–1051
Itier Chabot 1052–1073
Guy de Laront 1076–1086
Humbauld de Saint-Sèvère 1087–1095
Guillaume D'Uriel 1098–1100
Pierre Viroald 1100–1105
Eustorge 1106–1137
Gérald II du Cher 1142–1177
Sébrand Chabot 1179–1198
Jean de Veyrac 1198–1218
Bernard de Savène 1219–1226
Guy de Cluzel 1226–1235
[Guillaume du Puy] 1235
Durand<ref>Durandus had been Provost of S. Junianus and Canon of Limoges.  He was the subject of a disputed election, which was taken up by Pope Gregory IX on 18 January 1238. On 1 August 1240 Pope Gregory wrote to the Bishop of Bourges to ordain Durandus a priest and consecrate him a bishop. His bulls of consecration and installation were approved on 10 October 1240. Durandus died on 29 December 1245.  A. Potthast, Regesta pontificum Romanorum I (Berlin 1874), p. 924, no. 10922. Eubel, I, p. 301, with note 1.</ref> 1240–1245
Aymeric de La Serre 1246–1272
Gilbert de Malemort 1275–1294
Raynaud de La Porte 1294–1316

1300 to 1500
Gérard Roger 1317–1324

Hélie de Talleyrand 1324–1328
Blessed Roger le Fort 1328–1343
Nicolas de Besse 1343–1344 (never consecrated)
Guy de Comborn 1346–1347
Jean de Cros 1347–1371
Aymeric Chati de L'Age-au-Chapt 1371–1390
Bernard de Bonneval 1391–1403 (Avignon Obedience)
Hugues de Magnac 1403–1412
Ramnulfe de Peyrusse des Cars 1414–1426
Hugues de Rouffignac 1426–1427
Pierre de Montbrun 1427–1456
Jean de Barthon I. 1457–1484
Jean de Barthon II. 1484–1510

1500 to 1800

René de Prie 1514–1516
Philippe de Montmorency 1517–1519
Charles de Villiers de L`Isle-Adam 1522–1530
Antoine de Lascaris 1530–1532
Jean de Langeac 1533–1541
Jean du Bellay 1541–1544
Antoine Senguin 1546–1550
César des Bourguignons 1555–1558
Sébastien de L'Aubespine 1558–1582
Henri de La Marthonie 1587–1618
Raymond de La Marthonie 1618–1627
François de Lafayette 1628–1676
Louis de Lascaris D'Urfé 1676–1695
François de Carbonel de Canisy 1695–1706, † 1723
Antoine de Charpin de Genetines (13 Sep 1706 Appointed – 1729 Resigned. 21 Jun 1739 Died)
Charles de la Roche Aymon (Auxiliary Bishop : 1725–1729)
Benjamin de l'Isle du Gast (14 August 1730 – 6 September 1739)
Jean-Gilles du Coëtlosquet (1739–1758)
Louis-Charles du Plessis d'Argentré (3 Sep 1758 Appointed – 28 Mar 1808 Died)
Léonard Gay-Vernon (Constitutional Bishop of Haute-Vienne) (1791–1793)

From 1800
Marie-Jean-Philippe Dubourg (29 Apr 1802 Appointed – 31 Jan 1822 Died)
Jean-Paul-Gaston de Pins (1822–1824)
Prosper de Tournefort (13 Oct 1824 Appointed – 7 Mar 1844 Died)
Bernard Buissas (21 Apr 1844 Appointed – 24 Dec 1856 Died)
Florian Desprez (4 Feb 1857 Appointed – 30 Jul 1859 Appointed, Archbishop of Toulouse)
Relix-Pierre Fruchaud (1859–1871)
Alfred Duquesnay (16 Oct 1871 Appointed – 17 Feb 1881 Appointed Archbishop of Cambrai)
Pierre Henri Lamazou (17 Feb 1881 Appointed – 3 Jul 1883 Appointed Bishop of Amiens)
François-Benjamin-Joseph Blanger (3 Jul 1883 Appointed – 11 Dec 1887 Died)
Firmin-Léon-Joseph Renouard (28 Feb 1888 Appointed – 30 Nov 1913 Died)
Hector-Raphaël Quilliet (24 Dec 1913 Appointed – 18 Jun 1920 Appointed Bishop of Lille)
Alfred Flocard (16 Dec 1920 Appointed – 3 Mar 1938 Died)
Louis-Paul Rastouil (21 Oct 1938 Appointed – 7 Apr 1966 Died)
Henri Gufflet † (7 Apr 1966 Succeeded – 13 Jul 1988 Retired)
Léon-Raymond Soulier (13 Jul 1988 Succeeded – 24 Oct 2000 Retired – 25 December 2016 Died)
Christophe Dufour (24 Oct 2000 Appointed – 20 May 2008 Appointed Bishop of Aix en Provence) 
François Michel Pierre Kalist (17 May 2009 – 20 Sept 2016 Appointed Bishop of Clermont-Ferrand)
Pierre-Antoine Bozo (10 April 2017 Appointed – )

Pilgrimages and Feasts

In 994, when the district was devastated by a plague (mal des ardents''), the epidemic ceased immediately after a procession ordered by Bishop Hilduin on the Mont de la Joie, which overlooks the city. The Church of Limoges celebrates this event on 12 November.

The principal pilgrimages of the diocese are those of: Saint Valéric at Saint-Vaury (6th century); Our Lady of Sauvagnac at Saint-Léger-la-Montagne (12th century); Notre-Dame-du-Pont, near Saint-Junien (14th century), twice visited by Louis XI; Notre-Dame d'Arliquet, at Aixe-sur-Vienne (end of the 16th century); Notre-Dame-des-Places, at Crozant (since 1664).

See also
 Catholic Church in France

References

Bibliography

Studies

Reference works
 pp. 548–549. (Use with caution; obsolete)
  p. 301. (in Latin)
 p. 175.

 p. 219.

External links
  Centre national des Archives de l'Église de France, L'Épiscopat francais depuis 1919, retrieved: 2016-12-24.
 

Haute-Vienne
Roman Catholic dioceses in France